Nelapadu is a Village of the Indian state of Andhra Pradesh. It was a village in Thullur mandal of in Guntur district, prior to its denotification as gram panchayat.

Demographics 

The average literacy rate stands at 59.63 percent, with  literates.

Transport

Nelapadu is located on the Thullur and Guntur route. APSRTC run buses provide transport services from Guntur to Nelapadu.

References

Neighbourhoods in Amaravati